Noir Austral (Southern Black or Austral Black) is a French-language 2006 novel by French author Christine Adamo.

Plot
The book begins with a dive into the journey of an Aboriginal tribe which, in 70,000 BCE, crosses the straits of Sunda toward what will become Australia. It is a chaotic and cadaver-ridden course and a fight against climatic evolution. Through centuries, the odyssey reveals a challenging cohabitation with other species and soon a violent confrontation with white Caucasian newcomers.

In an additional contemporary plot, Liz, a young Australian woman, moves to France in search of her lost origins. But behind its postcard appearance, the small Provence village where her mother had lived is not what it seems to be. Somebody tries to drown Liz into the pond near her new house, just before the young woman finds a dead body in this pond. Liz is still far from knowing what or who she will have to fight, what or who has followed her from Sydney, from a past that she did not even suspect.

Besides the criminal aspects, the story is a novelistic presentation of the history of humankind, trying to make the reader look at the world differently and make them understand that differences are really relative.

Release details
2006, France, Liana Levi, Pub date 4 April 2006
2008, France, Folio policier (Gallimard), Pub date 8 April 2008
2007 (Nel Cuore d'Australia), Italy, Reportage 2000 (Touring Editore), 
2009 (Australish Zwart), Netherlands, De Geus, 

2006 novels
Novels set in Australia
Novels set in Provence
French crime novels